The 2018–19 Senior Women's Challenger Trophy was the ninth edition of the women's List-A tournament in India. It was played from 3 January to 6 January 2019. The participating teams were India Blue, India Green and India Red. It was played in a round-robin format, with the top two progressing to the final. India Red defeated India Blue by 15 runs in the final to win the Challenger Trophy for the 3rd time.

Squads

Standings 

 The top two teams qualified for the final. 
Last updated: 5 January 2019

Group stage

Final

Statistics

Most runs

Most wickets

References

2018–19 Indian women's cricket
2018–19
Domestic cricket competitions in 2018–19
Senior Women's Challenger Trophy